Edward V. "Mickey" Stephens (April 4, 1944 – August 14, 2021) was an American politician. He was a member of the Georgia House of Representatives from the 165th District, serving since 2008. He was a member of the Democratic Party, and  also served in the House from 2002 to 2004.

References

1944 births
2021 deaths
Democratic Party members of the Georgia House of Representatives
Politicians from Savannah, Georgia
21st-century American politicians
African-American state legislators in Georgia (U.S. state)
21st-century African-American politicians
20th-century African-American people